Cybaeus raymondi is a spider species found in France.

See also 
 List of Cybaeidae species

References

External links 

Cybaeidae
Spiders described in 1916
Spiders of Europe